Suzanne Graff is an American actress.

Biography
A native of Milwaukee, Wisconsin, Graff performed onstage for several seasons at the American Folklore Theatre (AFT) in shows such as Lumberjacks in Love which  became one of the company's biggest box office hits.

She originated the role of the  wisecracking jill-of-all-trades  secretary Charlene “Charlie” Osmanski in the Off-Broadway production of  Zombies from The Beyond 
  and played the role of the Effy, the gossipy postwoman, in the regional production of The Spitfire Grill. Other New York credits include performances in Twelfth Night with the Riverside Shakespeare Company.

She has performed in national tours of She Stoops to Conquer, As You Like It, Oedipus and A Midsummer Night’s Dream. In Milwaukee, she has appeared at the Skylight Opera Theatre and Theatre Tesseract. Other regional credits include She Loves Me at the Indiana Repertory Theatre and in the Twin Cities at the Great American History Theatre and the Jon Hassler Theater.

Since 1998, Graff and her husband, Jerry Gomis, have collaborated as producers for Door Shakespeare theatre, where her acting credits have included roles in productions such as Twelfth Night, the Merchant of Venice, Romeo and Juliet, The Merry Wives of Windsor  and Much Ado About Nothing.  She studied with acting teachers such as Paul Sills and trained with the National Shakespeare Conservatory in New York.

References

American stage actresses
University of Delaware alumni
Living people
Year of birth missing (living people)
Actresses from Milwaukee
21st-century American women